Ambelania is a genus of flowering plants belonging to the family Apocynaceae.

Its native range is Southern Tropical America.

Species:
 Ambelania acida Aubl. 
 Ambelania duckei Markgr. 
 Ambelania occidentalis Zarucchi

References

Rauvolfioideae
Apocynaceae genera